Tyrone Savage is a Canadian theatre, film and television actor and theater director. He is the son of actor Booth Savage and Janet-Laine Green. He is currently living in Toronto, Ontario, Canada. He provided the voices of Matthias in Redwall and Lightning in Total Drama.

Filmography

Film

Television

Video games

References

External links 

Living people
Canadian male film actors
Canadian male voice actors
Canadian male television actors
Year of birth missing (living people)
Place of birth missing (living people)